Ahmet Sağlam (born 9 May 1987), is a Turkish football player currently playing for VfB Oldenburg as a defender.

He previously played for Beylerbeyi, Eyüpspor and Eskişehirspor. Sağlam appeared in five Süper Lig matches during 2008-09 season with Eskişehirspor.

Career

SV Straelen
In the summer 2019, Sağlam left VfB Oldenburg to join SV Straelen. A few days into his new adventure, he picked up a tibia shaft fracture injury and was never able to play for the club, before the contract was terminated at the end of the year.

References

External links
 Profile at TFF.org 
 Ahmet Sağlam at Soccerway

1987 births
Living people
German footballers
Turkish footballers
German people of Turkish descent
Eskişehirspor footballers
Beylerbeyi S.K. footballers
Eyüpspor footballers
Göztepe S.K. footballers
Turgutluspor footballers
Kırklarelispor footballers
Fethiyespor footballers
TKİ Tavşanlı Linyitspor footballers
VfB Oldenburg players
Süper Lig players
TFF First League players
TFF Second League players
Regionalliga players
Sportspeople from Bonn
Association football defenders
Footballers from North Rhine-Westphalia